Papayya or Papaiah (Telugu: పాపయ్య) is a male given name. Notable people with the name include:

 Jandhyala Papayya Sastry, an eminent Telugu writer and lyricist
 Vaddadi Papaiah,  a painter and illustrator
 Avadhanum Paupiah, a dubash, or interpreter in the service of the British East India Company.

Masculine given names